Aceguá is a municipality in the state of Rio Grande do Sul, Brazil.

Paleontology 
Here are outcrops located between the City of Aceguá and Bagé, located along the highway BR-153. They are Rio do Rasto Formation and Late Permian age.

See also
List of municipalities in Rio Grande do Sul

References

Location 
It is located on Rio grande do sul, on the border with Uruguay.

Municipalities in Rio Grande do Sul
Brazil–Uruguay border crossings